Alpheus Spring Packard Jr. LL.D. (February 19, 1839 – February 14, 1905) was an American entomologist and palaeontologist. He described over 500 new animal species – especially butterflies and moths – and was one of the founders of The American Naturalist.

Early life
He was the son of Alpheus Spring Packard Sr. (1798–1884) and the brother of William Alfred Packard.  He was born in Brunswick, Maine, and was Professor of Zoology and Geology at Brown University in Providence, Rhode Island, from 1878 until his death. He was a vocal proponent of Neo-Lamarckism during the eclipse of Darwinism.

Career & Works
His chief work was the classification and anatomy of arthropods, and contributions to economic entomology, zoogeography, and the phylogeny and metamorphoses of insects. Packard was appointed to the United States Entomological Commission in 1877 where he served with Charles Valentine Riley and Cyrus Thomas. He wrote school textbooks, such as Zoölogy for High Schools and Colleges (eleventh edition, 1904).  His Monograph of the Bombycine Moths of North America was published in three parts (1895, 1905, 1915, edited by T. D. A. Cockerell).

He was elected as a member to the American Philosophical Society in 1878.

Death
He died on February 14, 1905.

Writings

 Report on the insects collected on the Penobscot and Alleguash Rivers, during August and September, 1861, Sixth Annual Report of the Secretary of the Maine Board of Agriculture, Augusta, Maine (pp. 373-376) (1861)
 Guide to the Study of Insects (1869; third edition, 1872)
 The Mammoth Cave and its Inhabitants (1872), with F. W. Putnam
 Life-History of Animals (1876)
 A Naturalist on the Labrador Coast (1891)
 Lamarck, the Founder of Evolution: His Life and Work (1901), French translation, 1903.

Notes

References

External links

 The entomological writings of Dr. Alpheus Spring Packard
 
 
 
Gallica Two works by Packard
Brunoniana Biography
Nomina circumscribentia insectorum On the phylogeny of the Lepidoptera. Zoologischer Anzeiger, 18 (465): 228-236  1895.

1839 births
1905 deaths
American lepidopterists
American naturalists
American science writers
Harvard University alumni
Writers from Brunswick, Maine
Appleton family
Bowdoin College alumni
Lamarckism
Brown University faculty